Kadakadappai is a village in the Thanjavur taluk of Thanjavur district, Tamil Nadu, India.

Demographics 

As per the 2001 census, Kadakadappai had a total population of 373 with  186 males and  187 females. The sex ratio was 1005. The literacy rate was 70.25.

References 

 

Villages in Thanjavur district